Rutherford School is an independent special school for pupils with profound and multiple learning difficulties (PMLD) aged 3–19 that aims to provide inclusive education to learners whose very special needs are compounded by a high degree of dependency.

Rutherford School is part of The Garwood Foundation, a charity based in Croydon. The school is located on Melville Avenue, South Croydon, Greater London. The school facilitates learning that is supported and managed by a specialist range of therapies which address physical disabilities, sensory impairments and complex medical needs.  The school has on-site medical and therapy provisions including nurses, physiotherapists and creative arts therapists.

Sources
 Rutherford School official website
 The Garwood Foundation official website

External links
 

Special schools in the London Borough of Croydon
Private co-educational schools in London
Private schools in the London Borough of Croydon
Educational institutions with year of establishment missing